The 1939–40 Michigan Wolverines men's basketball team represented the University of Michigan in intercollegiate basketball during the 1939–40 season.  The team finished the season in sixth place in the Big Ten Conference with an overall record of 13–7 and 6–6 against conference opponents.

Bennie Oosterbaan was in his first year as the team's head coach.  James Rae was the team's leading scorer with 199 points in 20 games for an average of 10.0 points per game.  Rae was also the team captain.

Statistical leaders

References

Michigan
Michigan Wolverines men's basketball seasons
Michigan Wolverines basketball team
Michigan Wolverines basketball